Yash Day Yadav   (born 13 December 1997) is an Indian cricketer who represents Uttar Pradesh in domestic cricket and Gujarat Titans in Indian Premier League. He is a left arm fast-medium bowler.

Career 
He made his List A debut for Uttar Pradesh in the 2018–19 Vijay Hazare Trophy on 21 September 2018. He made his first-class debut for Uttar Pradesh in the 2018–19 Ranji Trophy on 1 November 2018. He made his Twenty20 debut for Uttar Pradesh in the 2018–19 Syed Mushtaq Ali Trophy on 21 February 2019. 

In February 2022, he was bought by the Gujarat Titans in the auction for the 2022 Indian Premier League tournament. He made his IPL debut on 13 April 2022, against Rajasthan Royals.

References

External links
 

1997 births
Living people
Indian cricketers
Uttar Pradesh cricketers
Gujarat Titans cricketers
Place of birth missing (living people)
Sam Higginbottom University of Agriculture, Technology and Sciences alumni